Park Sun-ho (born May 9, 1993) is a South Korean actor, singer, and model. Park made his acting debut in the MBC television series Golden Rainbow in 2014. He also debuted as a singer in 2014 with the song "After Love" (Ballad Ver.) for the 2014 television series Love Cells.

Most recently, Park is known for being a contestant on the Mnet boy group survival program Produce X 101 (2019) and as Lee Gwang-cheol in the OCN television series Rugal (2020).

Career

2008 - 2014: Early Music Aspirations
Park initially wanted to debut as a Korean idol, and successfully passed the audition at Starship Entertainment in 2008 to become a trainee. He trained at the agency for six years before leaving the company in early 2014 after having failed to debut with both Boyfriend in 2011 and later Monsta X in 2015. During his time at Starship, he appeared in both Sistar19's "Ma Boy" and Sistar's "Give It to Me" music videos in 2011 and 2013, respectively.

2014 - 2018: Career Change to Acting & Debut as a Singer
After leaving Starship, Park decided to pursue an acting career. After signing with SidusHQ in mid 2014, Park made his acting debut in the drama Golden Rainbow, playing the role of Kim Young-won /
Michinski Forever in the 34th episode of the series.

A rising new actor, he was later cast in major roles in Love Cells (2014), Start Again (2016) and I'm Sorry, But I Love You (2016).

Park also made his debut as a singer in 2014 with the song "After Love" (Ballad Ver.), which was included in the second soundtrack album for Love Cells.

He received an offer to participate on the second season of Produce 101 in 2017, but was unable to accept due filming another project at the time.

2019 - present: Produce X 101, Growing Popularity, and Military Service 

Park released the digital single "Still (겨울을 걷다)" in February 2019, and also contributed to the song's lyrics and music.

In March 2019, Park was revealed to be a trainee for Produce X 101. During the show's first episode on May 3, 2019, he revealed that he joined the show amidst a growing successful acting career due to wanting to try pursuing an idol career once more. He would go on to finish in 25th place with 814,160+ votes.

Upon conclusion of his time on Produce X 101, Park planned to hold a fanmeeting, titled "Stand By Me" on August 17, 2019. However, the fanmeeting would be postponed for undisclosed reasons.

In October 2019, Park was cast in the role of Lee Gwang-cheol for the 2020 OCN drama Rugal. The show was distributed internationally by Netflix.

In December 2022, Park signed with Namoo Actors.

Personal life

Military service 
On August 6, 2020, it was announced that Park began his military service in the Ministry of National Defense on August 10, 2020. He is expected to serve for two years as a member of the honor guard. He was discharged on February 9, 2022.

Filmography

Film

Television series

Web series

Television shows

Music Videos

Hosting

Discography

Singles

Awards and nominations

References

External links 

 
 
 
 
 Park Sun-ho on Naver Movies 

1993 births
Living people
Produce 101 contestants
South Korean male models
South Korean male television actors
South Korean male film actors
IHQ (company) artists
South Korean male idols